The December Group (Decembarska grupa) was a Serbian artistic group founded in Belgrade in 1955. It ceased to exist in 1960.

Group members were: Zoran Petrović, Miloš Bajić, Aleksandar Luković, Lazar Vujaklija, Mladen Srbinović, Aleksandar Tomašević, Lazar Vozarević, Miodrag B. Protić, Stojan Ćelić and Dragutin Cigarčić.

The group has held nine exhibitions, and there were two retrospective in Belgrade in 1969 at the Gallery of the Cultural Center and in 1995 at the Zepter Gallery.

Art 

After the stabilization of the political and ideological situation in Yugoslavia after 1950. the conditions were created for opening new avenues of creativity in the field of art. The break with the dogmatic aesthetics of socialist realism has enabled a new generation of artists that had a great impact on the formation of new formal treatments of renewed modernism after World War II. The December Group was certainly at the forefront of these changes in the second half of the 1950s. Although it constituted of artists with different aesthetic views, its place in the history books is clearly defined in the range of "more contemporary modernism" and "socialist aestheticism"—that is the one area in which the artists clearly tended towards the evolution of contemporary representational paintings in the trends of form. Close understanding within this group of artists is their tendency to form geometrization, that became leading aesthetic characteristics of this period. After the dissolution of the group its members continued on their separate ways to mould picture of modern Serbian art in the second half of the 20th century.

Exhibitions 
 1955. 4–15 December – Umetnički paviljon, Beograd
 1956. 20–30 September, Umetnički paviljon, Sarajevo
 1956. 17–27 November, Umetnički paviljon, Beograd
 1957. 11–20 December, Umetnički paviljon, Beograd
 1958. 15 April – 4 May, Galeria Sztuki, Varšava
 1958. 4–15 October, Umjetnički paviljon, Zagreb
 1958. 21–31 December, Umetnički paviljon, Beograd
 1960. April–May, Narodni muzej, Pančevo
 1960. 21–30 December, Umetnički paviljon, Beograd

References

Literature 
 Painting in the Twentieth century (The Second Epoch – after 1950) by Miodrag B. Protić in "The History of Serbian Culture", Pavle Ivic et al. (translated by Randall A. Major), Porthill Publishers, March 1996, 
 Slikarstvo šeste decenije, Jugoslovenska umetnosti XX veka (katalog izložbe), Muzej savremene umetnosti, Beograd, 1980

European artist groups and collectives